FAAP may refer to:
Fellow in the American Academy of Pediatrics
Fundação Armando Alvares Penteado, Brazil
Federation of Accrediting Agencies of the Philippines